Selvino is a comune (municipality) in the Province of Bergamo in the Italian region of Lombardy, located about  northeast of Milan and about  northeast of Bergamo.

Selvino borders the following municipalities: Albino, Algua, Aviatico, Nembro.

Demographic evolution

See also
 Selvino children

References

External links
 www.comunediselvino.it/